Luke Pearson (born 12 October 1987) is a British illustrator, cartoonist, and comic book writer best known for the Hilda series of comics for Nobrow Press, and Hilda, the Netflix series based on the comics. He has also storyboarded episodes of the Cartoon Network series Adventure Time, during its fifth and seventh seasons.

Early life
Luke Pearson was born in Stockton-on-Tees, but grew up mainly in Tamworth. His father worked in IT and his mother was a solicitor's secretary. In their spare time, his father played and recorded music and his mother painted.

Career

Bibliography
His first comic was published in 2008 as part the anthology Ctrl.Alt.Shift Unmasks Corruption, edited by Paul Gravett. His first published drawing was in Bizarre magazine "of a little kid holding a knife with his mouth all stitched up".

In 2010, Nobrow Press published Hildafolk, the first of a series of graphic novels about a young girl's adventures in a world inspired by Scandinavian folklore.

In 2018, Netflix released the first season of Hilda, a show based on the Hildafolk series.

Filmography

Film

Television

Awards and nominations

References

External links
 
 

Hilda
1987 births
British comics artists
British illustrators
British storyboard artists
Living people
British male television writers
Showrunners
The New Yorker people
People from Stockton-on-Tees
People from Tamworth, Staffordshire